When the Keyboard Breaks is a live album by one-off progressive metal supergroup Liquid Trio Experiment, recorded during a Liquid Tension Experiment live show at the Park West in Chicago, Illinois.

Background
At the beginning of the track "Universal Mind", Jordan Rudess's Roland Fantom-G8 keyboard had a malfunction where the printed circuit board underneath the keys has slid slightly to the side, resulting in every key playing both the correct note, but also simultaneously a note half a step higher than the key.

While the rest of the band covered for him by briefly playing "Entrance of the Gladiators", Rudess left the stage to figure out a solution, since he didn't have his usual technician or a substitute keyboard with him. To compensate, the other three musicians decided to improvise until Rudess came back. Rudess had to stay on the phone with Roland in Japan for at least 20 minutes trying to figure out what was wrong. The other three just continued to jam with drummer Mike Portnoy giving updates every now and then (the determining point for the track splices). In the end, Rudess took John Petrucci's guitar and started jamming, then Petrucci took the bass, since Tony Levin was playing the Chapman Stick. When that jam was over, Portnoy ended up taking Levin's bass and Charlie Benante ended up playing drums. The keyboard was never fixed that night.

The production of the album was not official, as it was taken from a live stereo recording from the mix off stage. Thus there was no way for it to be properly mixed so everything is how the audience heard it.

The name of the album alludes to the track "When the Water Breaks" from Liquid Tension Experiment 2.

Track listing

Personnel
Tony Levin - Bass, Chapman Stick
Mike Portnoy - Drums, bass on track 8
John Petrucci - Guitar, Bass from 2:40 of track 7
Jordan Rudess - Keyboards on track 1, guitar from 2:00 of track 7
Charlie Benante - Drums on Track 8

References 

2009 live albums
Liquid Tension Experiment albums